The U.S. state of Alaska has had a system of direct voting since 1956, when it was still a territory. The first ballot measures were related to statehood and the constitution of the new state.

Background 
Alaska was purchased by the United States in 1867, however, it did not become an incorporated territory of the United States until 1912. The Constitution of Alaska, itself ratified by a vote of the people in 1956, outlined specific guidelines for ballot measures in Article XI, stating that "the people may propose and enact laws by the initiative, and approve or reject acts of the legislature by the referendum." Congress approved statehood in 1958 and when Alaska formally entered the union in 1959, it became the 20th state to have a system of direct voting.

In 1960, Alaskan voters saw seven ballot measures on election day, including an initiative that would move the state capital from Juneau to an undefined location in the Cook Inlet. While this measure was defeated, four of the first six initiatives proposed moving the location of the capital, with different proposals appearing on the ballot in 1962, 1974, 1978, and 1994. The 1974 initiative passed, but voters rejected the required funding for such a move in 1980.

The Alaskan Legislature took steps to limit the number of measures that could appear on the ballot every year in 2004. The new rules, passed as a constitutional amendment, required that measures initiatives and referendums receive signatures from three-quarters of Alaska's legislative districts and increased the total number of signatures required.

In 2020, Alaska became the second state in the nation to adopt a ranked-choice voting system when Ballot Measure 2 passed by less than 4,000 votes. Implementation of this system was postponed while state courts processed several legal challenges, but the Alaska Supreme Court upheld the measure in January 2022. The system was first used in the 2022 special election primary.

1960—1999

1960

1962

1964

1966

1968

1970

1972

1973

1974

1976

1978

1980

1982

1983

1984

1986

1988

1990

1992

1994

1996

1998

1999

2000—

2000

2002

2004

2006

2007

2008

2010

2012

2014

2016

2018

2020

2022

See also 

 Elections in Alaska
 Referendum

Notes

References 

Alaskan ballot measures
Alaska law
Alaska elections
Government of Alaska
Alaska-related lists